Metallurg Stadium is a multi-use stadium in Olmaliq, Uzbekistan.  It is currently used mostly for football matches, on club level by Olmaliq FK of the Uzbek League. The stadium has a capacity of 11,000 spectators.

References

Football venues in Uzbekistan